Alien Weaponry is a New Zealand thrash metal band from Waipu, formed in Auckland in 2010. The band consists of drummer Henry de Jong, guitarist Lewis de Jong and, since August 2020, bass player Tūranga Morgan-Edmonds. All three members have Māori ancestry and a number of their songs are written and performed in the Māori language.

History
Alien Weaponry was formed in Auckland in 2010 by two brothers, drummer Henry Te Reiwhati de Jong and guitarist/singer Lewis Raharuhi de Jong, who were only 10 and 8 years old respectively. Their mother and their paternal grandfather are of Dutch descent, and their father and paternal grandmother are Māori. Their tribal connections are with Ngāti Pikiao and Ngāti Raukawa. The brothers named the band Alien Weaponry after watching the film District 9. After moving to the small town of Waipu they were joined by bassist Ethan Trembath in April 2013. Trembath replaced Wyatt Channings who had briefly played bass for the band the previous year. The band were managed by the de Jong boys' father Niel, himself an experienced rock musician and audio engineer who also filled the role of front of house sound engineer when they toured. Their mother Jette is also involved with the band, tour managing and acting as the band's publicist.

In 2016, the band won both the national finals of Smokefreerockquest and Smokefree Pacifica Beats—the only band to have ever won both events. They had previously come second in the 2015 Smokefree Rockquest, and been regional finalists for four years running. The band also toured with New Zealand chart topping band Devilskin on their "We Rise" tour in 2014 and performed at The Powerstation in support of Shihad in May 2015. Alien Weaponry are believed to be youngest recipients to have ever received New Zealand on Air funding with their song "Rū Ana Te Whenua" in October 2015. They received a  grant to complete recording of their song and produce a video in 2015 and then another two  On Air grants in 2016 to record their singles "Urutaa" and "Raupatu" and produce music videos. In 2016, the band was named by UK Metal Hammer magazine as one of New Zealand's top 10 metal acts.

The band toured Europe and North America for the first time in the latter half of 2018, performing as a supporting act for Ministry in their American tour. During their European tour, they performed at several large music festivals, including Metaldays, and Wacken Open Air, the largest heavy metal music festival in the world. In 2019 they toured Europe and North America again. As bassist Ethan was unavailable for the final American leg of the tour as he chose to return to New Zealand to finish his high school exams, bassist Bobby Oblak filled the role. The band had stated that they had a goal of performing at Wacken before Henry, the drummer, was 20. They succeeded in that goal, as Henry was only 18 at the time of their performance.

On 17 February 2019, the band (alongside Radio New-Zealand) released a ten part documentary series entitled: 'Alien Weaponry Shake Europe', that documented their European tour the year prior. In December 2018, Holding My Breath was made the official theme song for NXT TakeOver: Phoenix (series of specials produced by WWE featuring NXT brand).

On 19 August 2020, it was announced that bassist Ethan Trembath would be departing the band and he would be replaced with high school friend Tūranga Morgan-Edmonds, also Māori, of Ngāti Rārua, Ngāti Wai and Ngāti Hine. In official video declaration Ethan Trembath said that the reason of leaving the band is: "health and my own happiness" also being away from home and pursuing career in making music in studio.

10 September 2020 saw an announcement from the band that they were shifting management to The Rick Sales Entertainment Group based in Los Angeles. Rick Sales is the long-standing manager of Slayer and also represents other notable metal artists such as Gojira, Mastodon and Ghost in his small exclusive portfolio.
Niel de Jong continued on in the role of production manager and front of house engineer under the pseudonym Hammerhead.

January 2021 saw Alien Weaponry appear on the cover of British heavy metal publication Metal Hammer Magazine with the tag line "Meet The Future Of Metal"   The band was profiled by The Guardian newspaper in September 2021.

They were nominated 'Breakthrough Oceanian Band' and 'Breakthrough International Band' at the 2021 Global Metal Apocalypse awards, they finished 3rd & 4th respectively.

Albums
Alien Weaponry released their debut EP The Zego Sessions in August 2014 and began work on their debut album at Neil Finn's Roundhead Studios in Auckland with record producer Tom Larkin in September 2015. In November 2016 Alien Weaponry released their single and music video for "Urutaa" as the first offering from their upcoming album. February 2017 saw the release of their second single "Raupatu" and in July 2017 they released "Rū Ana Te Whenua".

In January 2018 the band went back into the studio with producer Hammerhead to continue work on their first full length album which included some of their biggest hits, Kai Tangata and Holding My Breath. On 1 June 2018, their album Tū was released, debuting at number five on the New Zealand album charts, the top New Zealand album of the week.

On 17 September 2021, they released their sophomore album Tangaroa, also produced and mixed by Hammerhead at their studio in Waipu New Zealand.

Musical style, influences and lyrical themes

Alien Weaponry's debut single, "Urutaa", is sung partly in the Māori language and was originally about a clash of ideas and expectations leading to stress and unhappiness, which was likened to a plague or urutaa (an outbreak). The Māori lyrics refer to events that occurred in the Bay of Islands in the 1800s and what followed after a pocket watch was inadvertently dropped into the harbour. The misunderstanding culminated in the burning of the Boyd, a grim set of events in New Zealand's colonial history. The band says, "This incident is used in this song as a metaphor for the misunderstandings that continue to plague us today – between cultures, generations and individuals who torment each other through lack of understanding." 

The band's second single "Raupatu" (released in February 2017) is about land confiscations by the New Zealand colonial government in the 1800s and the legislation of 1863 that allowed it to happen. Their third single, "Rū Ana te Whenua" (the trembling earth), released 1 July 2017, refers to the mighty battle at Pukehinahina/Gate Pa in 1864 where the brothers' great great great grandfather, Te Ahoaho, lost his life. 

The band's musical style has been described as "nü-metal tinged thrash" and "thrashing groove-metal", with the band naming Metallica, Rage Against the Machine, and Lamb of God as inspirations. They are also often likened to a Māori version of Roots-era Sepultura, both for their musical style and infusion of indigenous culture into their music.

Guitarist Lewis de Jong cites Stevie Ray Vaughan, Lamb of God, System of a Down, Meshuggah, and Polyphia as influences.

Members

Current members
 Henry de Jong – drums, backing vocals 
 Lewis de Jong – guitars, lead vocals 
 Tūranga Morgan-Edmonds – bass, backing vocals

Former members
 Wyatt Channings – bass, backing vocals 
 Ethan Trembath – bass, backing vocals

Discography

Studio albums

Extended plays

Singles

References

External links
 Official website
 
 Alien Weaponry at nzmusic.org.nz

2010 establishments in New Zealand
Māori music
Musical trios
New Zealand heavy metal musical groups
Thrash metal musical groups
Musical groups established in 2010
Ngāti Pikiao
Ngāti Raukawa
Māori-language singers